Martin Adamec (born 14 August 1998) is a Slovak footballer who plays for Polis Diraja Malaysia.

Career

FK Pohronie
Adamec signed with Pohronie in early February 2021 mere two days before the resumption of the Fortuna Liga. He joined the side after resigning from Nitra, following club's financial and internal issues.

References

External links
 
 Martin Adamec at ÖFB
 Martin Adamec at Futbalnet 
 

Living people
1998 births
People from Levice
Sportspeople from the Nitra Region
Slovak footballers
Slovak expatriate footballers
Slovakia youth international footballers
Slovakia under-21 international footballers
Association football midfielders
SKN St. Pölten players
Jagiellonia Białystok players
Wigry Suwałki players
Odra Opole players
FC Nitra players
FK Pohronie players
PDRM FA players
Austrian Regionalliga players
Ekstraklasa players
I liga players
Slovak Super Liga players
Malaysia Premier League players
Slovak expatriate sportspeople in Austria
Slovak expatriate sportspeople in Poland
Slovak expatriate sportspeople in Malaysia
Expatriate footballers in Austria
Expatriate footballers in Poland
Expatriate footballers in Malaysia